Șalvirii Vechi is a commune in Drochia District, Moldova. It is composed of three villages: Ceapaevca, Iliciovca and Șalvirii Vechi. At the 2004 census, the commune had 1,082 inhabitants. The commune is 214 metres (705 ft) above sea level.

Communes of Drochia District